Colorful Sensibility Part 2 is the follow-up album of Colorful Sensibility by South Korean band F.T. Island, released on October 17, 2008, two months after the main album.

Track list

References

 
 

2008 EPs
Pop rock albums by South Korean artists
FNC Entertainment albums
F.T. Island EPs
Korean-language albums